The Raft River is a river in the U.S. states of Utah and Idaho.

Raft River may also refer to:

 Raft River (British Columbia), a river in British Columbia, Canada
 Raft River (Washington), a river on the Olympic Peninsula
 Raft River, a community in Cassia County, Idaho
 Raft River Mountains, in Box Elder County, Utah
 Raft River Jr./Sr. High School, in Malta, Idaho
 Rat River Settlement, in the Rural Municipality of De Salaberry, Manitoba, Canada

See also
 Raft (disambiguation)
 Rat River (disambiguation)